Steve Taylor (born 1967) is an English author and lecturer/researcher in psychology, who has written several books on psychology and spirituality. He is a senior lecturer in psychology at Leeds Beckett University and is the current chair of the Transpersonal Psychology Section of the British Psychological Society.

Taylor's main interest is in transpersonal psychology, which investigates higher states of consciousness and 'awakening' experiences. Taylor has a master's degree (with distinction) in Consciousness and Transpersonal Psychology and a PhD in Psychology from Liverpool John Moores University. He writes a popular blog 'Out of the Darkness' for Psychology Today magazine, and also writes blog articles for Scientific American.

Career

He taught courses on personal development at the University of Manchester, and did his PhD research at Liverpool John Moores University, and is a senior lecturer at Leeds Beckett University.

Taylor's books have been published in 20 languages, while his articles and essays have been published in many academic journals and in the popular media, including The Journal of Humanistic Psychology, the Journal of Transpersonal Psychology, The Journal of Consciousness Studies, Psychologies, Resurgence, The Psychologist and The Daily Express. His work has been featured widely in the media in the UK, including on BBC Breakfast, BBC World TV, Radio 4 and 5, and in The Guardian and The Independent. His work has been described by Eckhart Tolle as 'an important contribution to the shift in consciousness which is happening on our planet at present.

Taylor's book The Fall was described in The International Journal of Transpersonal Studies as "one of the most notable books of the first years of this century".

Taylor has been included in the list of the "100 Most Spiritually Influential Living people", published by  Watkins Books, "Mind, Body, Spirit magazine", for the last eight years. His books 'The Calm Center' and 'The Clear Light' are  books of poetic reflections and meditations, published by Eckhart Tolle Editions, with a foreword by Eckhart Tolle.

Personal life
Taylor lives in the Old Trafford area of Manchester, with his wife and 3 children.

Book publications
 Out of Time. (2003). Nottingham: Pauper's Press. (Now out of print)
 The Fall: The Insanity of the Ego in Human History and the Dawning of a New Era. (2005). Ropley: O Books.
 Making Time: Why Time Seems to Pass at Different Speeds and How to Control it. (2007). London: Icon Books.
 Waking From Sleep: Why Awakening Experiences Occur and How to Make them Permanent. (2010). London: Hay House.
 Out of the Darkness: From Turmoil to Transformation. (2011). London: Hay House.
 Back to Sanity: Healing the Madness of our Minds. (2012). London: Hay House.
 The Meaning: Poetic and Spiritual Reflections. (2013). Ropley: O Books.
 The Calm Center: Reflections and Meditations for Spiritual Awakening (An Eckhart Tolle Edition). (2015) New World Library.
 The Leap: The Psychology of Spiritual Awakening (An Eckhart Tolle Edition). (2017) New World Library.
 Spiritual Science: Why Science Needs Spirituality to Make Sense of the World (2018). London: Watkins Publishing.
 The Clear Light: Spiritual Reflections and Meditations (An Eckhart Tolle Edition). (2020) New World Library.
 Extraordinary Awakenings: When Trauma Leads to Transformation. (2021) New World Library.

As editor
 Not I, Not Other Than I: The Life and Teachings of Russel Williams. (2015). Ropley: O Books.

Audio course
 Return to Harmony: From Turmoil to Transformation. (2018) Sounds True.

References

External links
 Official website
 Steve Taylor,  Spontaneous Awakening Experiences: Beyond Religion and Spirituality The Journal of Transpersonal Psychology, 2012.
 Steve Taylor, The International Journal of Transpersonal Studies, 2005, 24, 48-60 The Sources of Higher States of Consciousness.
 Steve Taylor, The Journal of Humanistic Psychology, 2012, 52 (1), 30-52 Transformation Through Suffering: A Study of Individuals Who Have Experienced Positive Psychological Transformation Following Periods of Intense Turmoil.
 Steve Taylor, talk on Out of the Darkness at Watkins Bookshop, London, 2011.
 'Turn back the Clock.' BBC Magazine article on Making Time.

1967 births
Academics of Leeds Beckett University
Academics of Liverpool John Moores University
Academics of the University of Manchester
Alumni of Liverpool John Moores University
British psychologists
British spiritual writers
Living people
Transpersonal psychologists